The Indonesia national under-23 football team (Indonesia: Tim Nasional Sepak Bola Indonesia U-23) is considered to be the feeder team for the Indonesia national football team, represents Indonesia at football in the Olympic Games, Asian Games and Southeast Asian Games, as well as any other under-23 international football tournaments including the AFC U-23 Asian Cup. It is controlled by the Football Association of Indonesia.

This team was founded when the Olympic football was changed to an under-23 competition, and is also managed as under-22 team while it doesn't play in major competitions.

Kit 
The kits used are usually follow the senior team's kits. However, they sometimes used kits with different manufacturers. In 2006 Asian Games, they used Puma kits. For the 2018 Asian Games and 2021 Southeast Asian Games, they will use Li-Ning kits after the Indonesian Olympic Committee reached full sponsorship agreement with the apparel. Li-Ning will manufacture all clothes used by all Indonesian athletes.

Media coverage 
Indonesia team for Asian Cup finals tournament (if qualified, through 2024) and qualifiers, friendlies against other national teams and national clubs, and SEA Games (through 2021) are currently broadcast by TVRI (SEA Games only), MNC Media and Emtek. Previously, the SEA Games matches had been aired on Emtek from 2013 until 2017 plus the 2018 Asian Games (as the host country and broadcaster).

Results 

Matches in last 12 months, as well as any future scheduled matches

2022

Coaches

Coaching staff
As of 31 January 2023

Players

Current squad 
The following players were selected for the 2021 Southeast Asian Games.    

Caps and goals are corrected as of 22 May 2022 against .

Recent call-ups 
The following players have also been called up to the squad within the last 12 months.

OA Over-aged Player
PRE Preliminary squad
SUS Suspended
INJ Withdrew from the roster due to an injury
UNF Withdrew from the roster due to unfit condition
RET Retired from the national team
WD Withdrew from the roster for non-injury related reasons

Tournament record

Olympic Games

AFC Asian Cup

Asian Games

AFF Youth Championship

Southeast Asian Games

Islamic Solidarity Games

Honours
Continental
Islamic Solidarity Games
Silver medal: 2013

Regional
AFF U-23 Youth Championship
Champions (1): 2019
Southeast Asian Games
Silver medal: 2011, 2013, 2019
Bronze medal: 2017, 2021
Fourth place: 2001, 2005, 2015

Exhibition Tournaments
Aga Khan Cup
Champions (1): 1966
MNC Cup
Champions (1): 2013
2017 Aceh World Solidarity Tsunami Cup
Runners-up: 2017PSSI Anniversary CupThird place: 2018Merlion CupThird place: 20192019 Trofeo HB X CupChampions (1):''' 2019

See also

 Indonesia national football team
 Indonesia national under-21 football team
 Indonesia national under-20 football team
 Indonesia national under-17 football team

Notes

References

under-23
Asian national under-23 association football teams